Caesar is a masculine given name. Notable people with the name include:

 Caesar Bacarella (born 1975), American racing driver
 Caesar Cardini (1896–1956), Italian hotel owner, restaurateur, and chef in Tijuana, Mexico
 Caesar E. Farah (1929–2009), American scholar and historian
 Caesar Korolenko (1933–2020), Russian psychiatrist
 Caesar Lvovich Kunikov (1909–1943), officer in the Soviet Union
 "Caesar" Li Mao, member of Mandopop boy band Top Combine
 Caesar Rodney (1728–1784), signer of the American Declaration of Independence 1776
 Caesar Takeshi, Japanese kickboxer
 Caesar von Hofacker (1896–1944), member of the German Resistance

See also
 Caesar (disambiguation), for people known by the title "Caesar" or with Caesar as a nickname
 Cesar Romero (1907–1994), Cuban-American film and television actor
 Cesar, Spanish, Portuguese and French form name.

Masculine given names